Mirsahib Abbasov is an Azerbaijani professional footballer who plays as a forward for Sabail in the Azerbaijan Premier League.

Club career
On 29 November 2014, Abbasov made his debut in the Azerbaijan Premier League for Keşla match against Baku.

References

External links
 

1993 births
Living people
Association football forwards
Azerbaijani footballers
Azerbaijan Premier League players
Shamakhi FK players
Zira FK players
Sabail FK players